The Lower Hack Lift is a lift bridge carrying the New Jersey Transit Morristown Line across the Hackensack River at  mile 3.4, Jersey City, New Jersey.

The massive 3-track lift span was built in 1927–28 by the Delaware, Lackawanna and Western Railroad under the direction and design of John Alexander Low Waddell. The span was completed and opened October 2, 1928.

In addition to the Morristown and Gladstone lines, Montclair-Boonton Line service and North Jersey Coast Line service (via the Waterfront Connection) also use Lower Hack to access Hoboken Terminal.

According to US Coast Guard regulations, Lower Hack shall open upon signal with at least one hour notice to the bridge tender at Upper Hack Lift on the Main Line.

See also
 Upper Hack Lift (NJ Transit bridge at mile 6.9)
 List of bridges documented by the Historic American Engineering Record in New Jersey
 List of crossings of the Hackensack River
 NJT movable bridges

References

External links 

Movable Railroad Bridges of New Jersey-photo catalog
Movable Railroad Bridges of New Jersey
Views from Lower Hack
Lower Hack photos and notes

Bridges completed in 1928
Delaware, Lackawanna and Western Railroad bridges
Bridges over the Hackensack River
NJ Transit bridges
Railroad bridges in New Jersey
Vertical lift bridges in New Jersey
Buildings and structures in Jersey City, New Jersey
Bridges in Hudson County, New Jersey
Historic American Engineering Record in New Jersey
Kearny, New Jersey
1928 establishments in New Jersey
Steel bridges in the United States